Carlos Moyá was the defending champion and won in the final 6–4, 3–6, 7–5 against Filippo Volandri.

Seeds
A champion seed is indicated in bold text while text in italics indicates the round in which that seed was eliminated.

  Carlos Moyá (champion)
  Fernando González (quarterfinals)
 n/a
  Olivier Rochus (first round)
  Fernando Vicente (first round)
  Rafael Nadal (semifinals)
  Filippo Volandri (final)
  David Ferrer (quarterfinals)

Draw

External links
 2003 Croatia Open draw

Croatia Open
2003 ATP Tour